Arshan Jasani (born 15 December 1998) is a Tanzanian cricketer. He played in the 2014 ICC World Cricket League Division Five tournament. In October 2021, he was named in Tanzania's Twenty20 International (T20I) squad for their matches in Group B of the 2021 ICC Men's T20 World Cup Africa Qualifier tournament in Rwanda. He made his T20I debut on 6 November 2021, for Tanzania against Cameroon. Later the same month, he was named in Tanzania's squad for the Regional Final of the 2021 ICC Men's T20 World Cup Africa Qualifier tournament, also in Rwanda.

References

External links
 

1998 births
Living people
Tanzanian cricketers
Tanzania Twenty20 International cricketers
Place of birth missing (living people)